In 1926 and 1927, Missouri implemented a major renumbering of its state highways because of the implementation of the US Highway System. Routes 2, 3, 7, 8, 9, 11, 12, 14, and 23 were entirely replaced by U.S. Routes. Routes 36, 40, 50, 60, 61, 62, 63, 65, 67, and 69 conflicted with new designations (note that Route 71, another conflicting number, had already been replaced by Route 3 by then because the portion of Route 3 here was not built), so the routes with these numbers had been renumbered. Note that a route number wasn't decided for renumbering State Route 65 (which was just removed from the state highway system temporarily) until 1927.

In 1927, additional renumberings took place, as what was planned as US 62 became US 60, what was planned as US 60 became US 66, and US 24 and US 54, which were not originally planned to enter the state, were added; State Routes 24 and 54 were renumbered, State Route 66 (another conflictive number) was replaced by US 54, and Route 68 was used for renumbering the road that was Route 65 before 1926.

References

State highways in Missouri
1926 in transport
1926 in Missouri
History of Missouri
Highway renumbering in the United States